Osbaston is a hamlet in the English county of Shropshire.

Osbaston forms part of the civil parish of Ercall Magna and the unitary authority of Telford and Wrekin, it lies eleven miles north-west from the centre of Telford.

External links

Villages in Shropshire